TG4 (TeleGiornale 4) is the brand for Italian TV channel of Mediaset network Rete 4's news programmes. They are shown domestically on Rete 4 several times throughout the day. Its editor-in-chief is Rosanna Ragusa.

Programme format
Rete 4 had a news program from its inception until 1984 and was called Gli Speciali Di Rete 4. However, in 1984, Rete 4 Ultimissima was established.

The programme is generally presented by a single newsreader. Most items will be made up of reports but may preceded or followed by a correspondent reporting live from the scene of the report.

Daily programme and presenters
 11:55 am edition (30 minutes): Luca Rigoni, Stefano Messina, Viviana Guglielmi.
 07:00 pm edition (50 minutes): Giuseppe Brindisi, Stefania Cavallaro.
 01:10 am edition (20 minutes): nobody (it is a collection of reports about main news of the past day).
 06:00 am edition (20 minutes): nobody (it is a collection of reports about main news of the past day).

Editor-in-chief
 July 1991–June 1992: Edvige Bernasconi
 June 1992–March 2012: Emilio Fede
 March 2012–January 2014: Giovanni Toti
 January 2014–May 2018: Mario Giordano
 May–August 2018, February–June 2019: Rosanna Ragusa
 August 2018-February 2019: Gerardo Greco
June 2019-today: Andrea Pucci

External links
 Official Website 

1992 Italian television series debuts
Italian television news shows
Mass media in Rome
Mediaset
Rete 4 original programming